Swati Singh  is an Indian politician and Minister of State (Independent Charge) for Woman welfare NRI, Flood Control, Agriculture export, Agriculture Marketing, Agriculture Foreign Trade and state minister in the Ministry of Women Welfare, Family Welfare, Maternity and Child Welfare in the Government of Uttar Pradesh.

Education
 M.M.S. in 2001 from University of Allahabad
 L.L.M. in 2007 from the University of Lucknow

Political life
She came in an active field of politics after her husband Daya Shankar Singh got expelled from the post of vice-president of Bhartiya Janta Party and party both for six years after a comment on BSP Chief Mayawati in a public meeting in September 2016. On 12 March 2017, the BJP revoked her husband's expulsion.

In 2017, she got elected as Member of Legislative Assembly of Uttar Pradesh from Sarojani Nagar, Lucknow as a Bharatiya Janta Party candidate. She got 1,08,506 votes in this election.
She became Minister of State (independent charge) in the cabinet of Chief Minister Yogi Adityanath.

She was appointed to the ministries of NRI, Flood control, Agriculture Marketing and Export, Women Welfare, Maternal and child welfare.

She also served as president of Uttar Pradesh BJP Mahila Morcha, a women's wing of Bharatiya Janata Party from October 2016 to February 2018.

In November 2019,she was riled up in case in which purported audio clip was released where she was heard allegedly threatening a police officer in Lucknow to drop an FIR against Ansal Builders. She goes on to ask the CO Binu Singh to sit with her to resolve the matter if she wanted to continue working in Lucknow.

References

Living people
Politicians from Lucknow
Uttar Pradesh MLAs 2017–2022
Bharatiya Janata Party politicians from Uttar Pradesh
Women in Uttar Pradesh politics
Yogi ministry
21st-century Indian women politicians
21st-century Indian politicians
1978 births